Protographium is a genus of mostly Neotropical swallowtail butterflies in the subfamily Papilioninae.

Taxonomy
The classification of species in the genus Protographium is undergoing changes as New World species are now being moved to other genera.
subgenus: Protographium
Protographium leosthenes (Doubleday, 1846)

subgenus: unassigned
Protographium × oberthueri Rothschild & Jordan, 1906

subgenus: Eurygraphium Möhn, 2002
species group: thyastes
Protographium calliste (Bates, 1864)

See also
 Graphium

References

Edwin Möhn, 2002 Schmetterlinge der Erde, Butterflies of the world Part XIIII (14), Papilionidae VIII: Baronia, Euryades, Protographium, Neographium, Eurytides. Edited by Erich Bauer and Thomas Frankenbach Keltern : Goecke & Evers ; Canterbury : Hillside Books.  All species and subspecies are included, also most of the forms. Several females are shown the first time in colour.

 
Butterfly genera